Benedict Chelidonius or Schwalbe (also Benedict Chelydonius or Caledonius; born c. 1460; died 1521) was an abbot of the Scottish monastery at Vienna. A scholar of Greek and a neo-Latin poet, he worked with the artist Albrecht Dürer. In some of his publications he took the name Musophilus.

Life
The 17th-century historian Thomas Dempster claimed Benedict to have been of Scottish origin, presumably on the basis of his surname (actually taken from the Greek cheridon, meaning swallow), and possibly also because of his association with the so-called Scottish Abbey in Vienna (actually of Irish foundation). In fact he came from around Nuremberg, and became a monk at the Abbey of St Aegidius in Nuremberg.

Chelidonius wrote Latin poetry on the passion of Christ and the life of the Blessed Virgin Mary to accompany woodcuts published by Albrecht Dürer in 1511. He moved to Vienna in 1514, becoming abbot of the Scottish Abbey in 1518. In 1519 he published an edition of the Libri quatuor sententiarum by Bandinus, a 12th-century theologian - an abridgement of Peter Lombard's Sentences which Chelidonius mistakenly thought to have been Peter Lombard's model.

He was a close friend of the theologian Johann Eck, the opponent of Martin Luther, and the Dictionary of National Biography, following Dempster, ascribed to him a tract against Luther, Contra Lutherum apostatam. However, the tract cannot be identified.

Benedict died on 8 September 1521.

Works
 Voluptatis cum Virtute disceptatio, 1515.
 Bandini Sententiarum de Rebus Theologicis, 1519. Reprinted, Louvain, 1557.

References

Sources

16th-century German theologians
16th-century Latin-language writers
German male non-fiction writers
German Renaissance humanists
Benedictines
Medieval German theologians
German abbots
15th-century births
Year of birth unknown
1521 deaths
16th-century German writers
16th-century German male writers